Finland will compete at the 2022 European Championships in Munich from August 11 to August 22, 2022.

Medallists

Competitors
The following is the list of number of competitors in the Championships:

Athletics

Beach Volleyball

Finland has qualified 1 male and 2 female pairs.

Canoe sprint

Qualification Legend: SF = Qualified for Semi-finals; BT = Qualified by Time; FA = Qualify to final (medal); FB = Qualify to final B (non-medal), KO = Last Place Knock Out

Men

Women

Cycling

Road

Women

Gymnastics

Finland has entered 5 men and 5 women.

Men

Qualification

Women

Qualification

Rowing

Men

Qualification Legend: FA=Final A (medal); FB=Final B (non-medal); FC=Final C (non-medal); FD=Final D (non-medal); SA/B=Semifinals A/B; SC/D=Semifinals C/D; SE/F=Semifinals E/F; R=Repechage

Women

Qualification Legend: FA=Final A (medal); FB=Final B (non-medal); FC=Final C (non-medal); FD=Final D (non-medal); SA/B=Semifinals A/B; SC/D=Semifinals C/D; SE/F=Semifinals E/F; R=Repechage

Sport climbing

Boulder

Table tennis

Triathlon

References

2022
Nations at the 2022 European Championships
European Championships